Valentin Kipyatkov (born June 5, 1976) is a Russian billionaire. He made his fortune from the software firm JetBrains, co-founded with Sergey Dmitriev. He resides primarily in Prague. He graduated from Saint Petersburg State University.

References

Russian billionaires
Living people
1976 births
Place of birth missing (living people)
Saint Petersburg State University alumni
Businesspeople from Prague
Russian emigrants to the Czech Republic
21st-century Russian businesspeople